The Boston mayoral election of 1987 occurred on Tuesday, November 3, 1987, between Mayor Raymond Flynn and City Council member Joseph M. Tierney. Flynn was re-elected to his second term.

The nonpartisan municipal preliminary election was held on September 22, 1987.

Candidates
Raymond Flynn, Mayor of Boston since 1983, member of the Boston City Council from 1978 to 1984, and state representative from 1971 to 1979.
Joseph M. Tierney, Member of the Boston City Council since 1972, Council President in 1979 and from 1983 to 1985.

Candidates eliminated in preliminary
Richard A. Black, member of the LaRouche movement.
Joel San Juan, member of the Socialist Workers Party.

Results

See also
List of mayors of Boston, Massachusetts

References

Mayoral election
Boston mayoral
Boston
Mayoral elections in Boston
Non-partisan elections